Shaikh Bhirkio is a village, deh and union council in Tando Muhammad Khan taluka of Tando Muhammad Khan District, Sindh. As of 2017, it has a population of 7,539, in 1,593 households. It is the seat of a tapedar circle, which also includes the villages of Burera, Chando Katiar, and Sanabani.

References 

Populated places in Tando Muhammad Khan District